Ioan Dicezare (August 12, 1916 in Bucharest – August 10, 2012 in Bucharest) was a leading Romanian fighter pilot and flying ace in World War II. He was born and died in Bucharest.

On April 22, 1943, Dicezare engaged a Soviet bomber formation and shot down one A-20 Boston, which fell behind Axis lines. He then returned to the airfield and took the group's liaison Bf-108 Taifun. He landed near the crash site and took the pilot and the observer prisoner.
 
In over 500 combat operations He was credited with 16 confirmed victories (and 3 probable) in aerial combat.

Dicezare died on 10 August 2012, 2 days before his 96th birthday. He was the last survivor of ”Grupul 7 Vânătoare” pilots who managed to escape the Stalingrad encirclement.

Decorations and awards

 Order of Michael the Brave, 3rd class (August 30, 1943) - campaign from Mariupol
 Order of Aeronautical Merit, Gold Cross with two bars and Knight with two straps (1943) - campaigns in the USSR from 1943
 Order of the Crown of Romania, 1st class with swords and Military Virtue ribbon (1943?)
 Iron Cross of 1939
2nd class (probably June 6, 1943)
1st class (probably August 17, 1943)

See also

List of World War II flying aces from Romania
Romanian Air Force

References

Bibliography

 Sorin Turturică, Cruciaţi ai înălţimilor. Grupul 7 Vânătoare de la Prut la Odessa, București: Editura Militară, 2012   
 Vasile Tudor - Un nume de legenda - Căpitan av. erou Alexandru Șerbănescu, București: Editura Modelism, 1998

External links

 Ioan Dicezare at WorldWar2
  Nota de Falecimento: Ion Dicesare at Sala de Guerra

1916 births
2012 deaths
Military personnel from Bucharest
Romanian Air Force officers
Romanian World War II flying aces
Recipients of the Iron Cross (1939), 1st class
Recipients of the Iron Cross (1939), 2nd class
Grand Crosses of the Order of the Crown (Romania)